The Jama Formation is a Pliocene to Early Pleistocene (Montehermosan to Ensenadan in the SALMA classification) geologic formation in Ecuador. The claystones and sandstones were deposited in an coastal environment. The age of the Jama Formation is constrained by 40Ar/39Ar dating of tephra beds. The formation is correlated to the Charco Azul Formation of western Panama and southeastern Costa Rica.

Subdivision 
The formation is subdivided in, from top to base:
 El Matal Member (fluvial)
 Punta Ballena Member (lower shoreface)
 Punta Pasa Borracho Member (marine)

Fossil content 
The formation has provided bivalve, gastropod and scaphopod fossils.

See also 

 List of fossiliferous stratigraphic units in Ecuador

References

Further reading 
 G. Cantalamessa, C. Di Celma, and L. Ragaini. 2005. Sequence stratigraphy of the Punta Ballena Member of the Jama Formation (Early Pleistocene, Ecuador): insights from integrated sedimentologic, taphonomic and paleoecologic analysis of molluscan shell concentrations. Palaeogeography, Palaeoclimatology, Palaeoecology 216:1-25
 H. A. Pilsbry and A.A. Olsson. 1941. A Pliocene fauna from Western Ecuador. Proceedings of the Natural Sciences of Philadelphia 93:1-79

Geologic formations of Ecuador
Pliocene Series of South America
Pleistocene Ecuador
Neogene Ecuador
Ensenadan
Uquian
Chapadmalalan
Montehermosan
Shale formations
Sandstone formations
Fluvial deposits
Shallow marine deposits
Formations